Grittleton House School was an independent school in Wiltshire, England, between 1951 and 2016, at Grittleton House.

History
A small, independent school, founded in 1951 by Mrs Joanna Shipp, it was co-educational at both primary and secondary levels and also a children's daycare provider.

The school was non-denominational and non-selective, so that classes were made up of pupils with a wide range of abilities. It offered pupils small classes and claimed to teach traditional family values, courtesy, consideration for others, and responsibility.

In 2008, the average class size was 15, and the school fees for day pupils were between £4,620 and £7,455.

The school closed in July 2016, when it had around 150 children, aged between two and sixteen.

Notable former pupils
 Jamie Cullum (born 1979), jazz-pop singer-songwriter
 Emma Pierson (born 1981), actress
 Angelica Mandy (born 1992), actress, best known for her role as Gabrielle Delacour in the film Harry Potter and the Goblet of Fire
 Simon Cousins (born 1965), musician

Notes

External links 
ISBI report on Grittleton House School
 BBC report on the school, 2005

Defunct schools in Wiltshire
Educational institutions established in 1951
Educational institutions disestablished in 2016
 
1951 establishments in England